István Mudin (16 October 1881 – 22 July 1918) was a Hungarian athlete who competed at the 1906 Intercalated Games and the 1908 Summer Olympics. He competed in various throwing events and in the pentathlon at the 1906 Intercalated Games and 1908 Summer Olympics and won two medals in 1906, in pentathlon and discus throw.

He was killed in action in Italy during World War I.

See also
 List of Olympians killed in World War I

References

1881 births
1918 deaths
People from Kétegyháza
Hungarian decathletes
Hungarian male discus throwers
Olympic athletes of Hungary
Medalists at the 1906 Intercalated Games
Athletes (track and field) at the 1906 Intercalated Games
Athletes (track and field) at the 1908 Summer Olympics
Austro-Hungarian military personnel killed in World War I
Sportspeople from Békés County